Kirby Jackson (born February 2, 1965) is a former professional American football defensive back who played for the Los Angeles Rams (1987) and the Buffalo Bills (1988–1992).  He helped the Bills win 4 AFC Championships, and was a member of 4 Bills Super Bowl teams. He later was acquired by the Seattle Seahawks, but did not see playing time as he was injured before the season.  Before his NFL career, he played for Mississippi State University and was selected by the New York Jets in the fifth round of the 1987 NFL Draft.  On September 30, 2022, Kirby Jackson was inducted into the Mississippi State M-Club Hall of Fame.

References

American football cornerbacks
Buffalo Bills players
Mississippi State Bulldogs football players
1965 births
Living people
People from Oktibbeha County, Mississippi
Los Angeles Rams players
National Football League replacement players